Phrynobatrachus anotis is a species of frog in the family Phrynobatrachidae.
It is endemic to Democratic Republic of the Congo.
Its natural habitats are dry savanna and moist savanna.

References

anotis
Endemic fauna of the Democratic Republic of the Congo
Amphibians described in 1959
Taxonomy articles created by Polbot